Aptostichus barackobamai, the Barack Obama trapdoor spider, is a species of spider in the family Euctenizidae named after the 44th President of the United States, Barack Obama.  The species was first reported by Professor Jason Bond of Auburn University in December 2012 as one of 33 new species of the genus Aptostichus.

Distribution
Aptostichus barackobamai is a species endemic to California, and has been observed at several locations in the northern part of the state.  Particular locations where populations are known to exist are Mendocino, Napa, Shasta, Sutter, and Tehama counties.

Conservation status
Due to the wide range and abundance of A. barackobamai, the species is not considered to be a threatened species overall, though some isolated populations (such as those local to the Sutter Buttes) may be vulnerable.

See also

Aptostichus stephencolberti
Aptostichus angelinajolieae
List of things named after Barack Obama
List of organisms named after famous people (born 1950–present)

References

External links
 Detailed description at species-id.net

Euctenizidae
Endemic fauna of California
Spiders of the United States
Natural history of the California Coast Ranges
Spiders described in 2012
Species named after Barack Obama
Fauna without expected TNC conservation status